AssassiNation is the sixth album by Brazilian death metal band Krisiun, released in 2006 on Century Media. It is dedicated In Memory of Doc and Dimebag.

Track listing

Credits
 Alex Camargo – bass, vocals
 Moyses Kolesne – guitar
 Max Kolesne – drums
 Andy Classen – producer
Jacek Wiśniewski – cover art

References

Krisiun albums
2006 albums
Century Media Records albums
Albums produced by Andy Classen